Tom Barlow (born July 8, 1995) is an American professional soccer player who plays as a forward for Major League Soccer club New York Red Bulls.

Career

Youth career
Barlow grew up in St. Louis, Missouri and attended Chaminade College Preparatory School. He played college soccer for four years at the University of Wisconsin, scoring 23 goals in 78 matches.
He also played in the PDL with Reading United, Des Moines Menace and Chicago FC United. He scored his first goal in the Lamar Hunt U.S. Open Cup against the Pittsburgh Riverhounds on May 17, 2017 in a 3–1 upset victory by Chicago.

New York Red Bulls II
On January 19, 2018, Barlow was drafted in the second round of the 2018 MLS SuperDraft, by the New York Red Bulls.  On March 15, 2018, he signed his first professional contract with New York Red Bulls II. On May 27, 2018, he scored his first goal for New York in a 4–1 victory over Indy Eleven. On August 25, 2018, Barlow recorded a second half hat-trick to help New York to a 4–4 draw with Charleston Battery after trailing 3–0 at halftime. On October 20, 2018, Barlow helped New York advance in the 2018 USL Playoffs, scoring the loan goal in a 1–0 victory over Charleston Battery.

On March 9, 2019, Barlow scored two goals in a 3–1 victory over Swope Park Rangers in the first match of the season. On July 10, 2019, he scored two goals to help New York to a 4-3 victory over Bethlehem Steel. He ended the season scoring 11 goals in 16 matches for the USL Championship squad in 2019.

New York Red Bulls

On May 8, 2019, Barlow was signed to a first team contract with New York Red Bulls. 
On May 19, 2019. Barlow scored his first goal for the first team on his debut in a 1–0 victory over Atlanta United. With the Red Bulls down to ten men he scored his first career MLS goal against Brad Guzan. He ended his first season with the first team scoring 5 goals in 14 appearances.

On September 27, 2020, Barlow scored two goals in a 4-1 victory over Montreal Impact. On February 26, 2022, Barlow scored the third goal for New York in a 3-1 victory over San Jose Earthquakes in the opening match of the season. On May 25, 2022, Barlow scored in a 3-1 victory for New York over Charlotte FC as his team advanced to the quarterfinals of the 2022 U.S. Open Cup. On 24 July 2022, Barlow scored the winning goal for New York in a 4-3 victory over Austin FC at Q2 Stadium.

Career statistics

References

External links
 

1995 births
Living people
American soccer players
Soccer players from St. Louis
Wisconsin Badgers men's soccer players
Reading United A.C. players
Des Moines Menace players
Chicago FC United players
New York Red Bulls II players
New York Red Bulls draft picks
New York Red Bulls players
USL League Two players
USL Championship players
Association football forwards
Chaminade College Preparatory School (Missouri) alumni
Major League Soccer players